Ingeborg Carnatz was a female international table tennis player from Germany.

She won a bronze medal at the 1930 World Table Tennis Championships in the mixed doubles with Sándor Glancz.

See also
 List of table tennis players
 List of World Table Tennis Championships medalists

References

German female table tennis players
World Table Tennis Championships medalists